Joe Walker (born 6 September 1992) is a New Zealand cricketer who plays first-class for Northern Districts. He made his List A debut for Northern Districts on 4 February 2017 in the 2016–17 Ford Trophy. In June 2018, he was awarded a contract with Northern Districts for the 2018–19 season.

References

External links
 

1992 births
Living people
New Zealand cricketers
Northern Districts cricketers
Cricketers from Hamilton, New Zealand